The following is a list of notable events and releases of the year 2016 in Danish music.

Events

January
 8 - The first recording is released of Danish composer Hans Abrahamsen's Grawemeyer award-winning work, let me tell you.
 27 The Léonie Sonning Music Foundation announces Leonidas Kavakos as the recipient of the Léonie Sonning Music Prize 2017.
 29 - The Ernst von Siemens Music Foundation announces Per Nørgård as the recipient of the 2016 Ernst von Siemens Music Prize.

February
 13 – The Dansk Melodi Grand Prix Final was arranged on February 13, at the Forum Horsens in Horsens.
 28 – Jazz violinist Svend Asmussen turned 100 years.

March

April
 1 - In the final of season 9 of Denmark's X Factor, the sister duo Embrace emerge winners, obtaining 60% of the public vote.

May

June
 1 – The 18th Distortion festival started in Copenhagen (June 1–5).
 25 - Roskilde Festival 2016 opens (June 25 - July 2).

July
 3 - Copenhagen Jazz Festival 2016 is opened (July 3–12).
 14 – G! Festival opened in Göta, Eysturoy, Faroe Islands (July 14–17), with a line-up including Songhoy Blues, Lucy Rose, Federspiel and the Hot 8 Brass Band.

August

September

October

November

December

Album and Singles releases

January

February

February

March

April

May

June

July

August

September

October

November

December

Deaths

January
 18 – Else Marie Pade, Danish composer (born 1924).

February
 20 – Ove Verner Hansen, Danish opera singer and actor (born 1932).

June
 27 – Pelle Gudmundsen-Holmgreen, Danish conductor (born 1932).

July
 18 – Karina Jensen (77), singer (Cartoons) (cancer).

See also
Music of Denmark
Denmark in the Eurovision Song Contest 2016

References

 
Danish music
Danish
Music